The Anglican Diocese of Ijesa North East is one of 17 within the Anglican Province of Ibadan, itself one of 14 provinces within the Church of Nigeria. The current bishop is Joseph Olusola, who was elected as the pioneer bishop in 2009.

References

Church of Nigeria dioceses
Dioceses of the Province of Ibadan
Anglican bishops of Ijesa North East